is a Japanese television series, a tokusatsu drama that is in the Kamen Rider Series; it is the 15th series during its Heisei run and 24th overall. The series, written by Gen Urobuchi, directed by Ryuta Tasaki and produced by Naomi Takebe, began airing on TV Asahi from October 6, 2013, replacing Kamen Rider Wizard in its initial timeslot and joining Zyuden Sentai Kyoryuger then Ressha Sentai ToQger in the Super Hero Time programming block, until Gaim concluded on September 28, 2014.

Story

In , a large company known as the Yggdrasill Corporation transformed the once-bustling suburb a city into a jōkamachi. To escape the resulting feeling of oppression, many of the youth in Zawame formed dance crews called Beat Riders to bring joy back into people's lives. Also rising in popularity is the Inves Game, a simulator that uses strange devices known as Lockseeds to summon monsters known as Inves. Kota Kazuraba, a member of the dance group Team Gaim, tries to find his place in the world while torn between his loyalty to his teammates and his sister Akira's insistence that he starts acting like an adult and finds a proper job. When Team Gaim's captain disappears after informing Kota of a strange belt he found, Kota discovers that the Lockseeds and Inves are from an alternate dimension known as Helheim Forest. Encountering a mysterious girl resembling his Team Gaim teammate and close friend Mai Takatsukasa, Kota uses a Sengoku Driver belt and the Orange Lockseed to become a samurai-armored warrior that is later named Armored Rider Gaim. In the meantime, including Team Baron's leader Kaito Kumon as Armored Rider Baron and Kota's Team Gaim teammate Mitsuzane Kureshima as Ryugen, other Armored Riders appear to amass social power throughout Zawame: Team Raid Wild's Ryoji Hase as Kurokage, Team Invitto's Hideyasu Jonouchi as Gridon, and the perfectionist ex-soldier Oren Pierre Alfonso as Bravo. Unbeknownst to the Armored Riders, the Yggdrasill Corporation monitors them and the Inves Games while the head of its R&D division, Mitsuzane's older brother Takatora, is the enigmatic white Armored Rider Zangetsu who is protecting a dark secret hidden within Helheim Forest.

Eventually, when Kota confronts Takatora as he becomes a New Generation Armored Rider alongside the Armored Rider development scientist Ryoma Sengoku as Duke, his aide Yoko Minato as Marika, and the Lockseed Dealer Sid as Sigurd, he learns the horrible truth of Helheim Forest: that it was home to a once-prosperous civilization that was eradicated by the strange plants growing throughout it, as anyone who consumed the fruit of these plants is turned into an Inves. Finding an ally in DJ Sagara, a pirate radio DJ who knows more than he is letting on such as the intelligent Overlord Inves, Kota finds himself in the middle of a Sengoku period-like brawl among various factions for the right to possess the power of Helheim Forest–the proverbial forbidden fruit itself–and the fate of life on Earth as he knows it. But while adamant to obtain the Golden Fruit to save the world, Kota notices the disastrous news from Oren and Hideyasu that Kaito transforms into his monstrous form and goes insane. His main objective is to use the fruit's power to shatter the status quo of the world before Kota stops his rampage.

Episodes

Films

The Fateful Sengoku Movie Battle

, released on December 14, 2013, is the annual entry of the "Movie Wars" film series, featuring a crossover between the cast and characters from Kamen Rider Gaim and Kamen Rider Wizard. A short teaser of the film was first shown during the screening of Kamen Rider Wizard in Magic Land, with a later teaser shown after the finale of Wizard announcing the release date. The events of the movie take place between episodes 9 and 10.

Kamen Rider Taisen

 was released in Japanese theaters on March 29, 2014. It was first hinted at in a trailer after The Fateful Sengoku Movie Battle. Many previous series' leading actors returned for the film, with Masahiro Inoue of Kamen Rider Decade, Renn Kiriyama of Kamen Rider W, and Kohei Murakami and Kento Handa of Kamen Rider 555, initially confirmed, with a subsequent trailer for the film also showing Shunya Shiraishi from Kamen Rider Wizard. Kento Handa, on his Ustream channel, announced that he had been on set with Ryo Hayami of Kamen Rider X, and Hiroshi Fujioka of the original Kamen Rider was announced as being in the cast. In a recent trailer and magazine, the Sentai teams' Ressha Sentai ToQger and Zyuden Sentai Kyoryuger were confirmed to be in the movie, Shun Sugata of the Birth of the 10th! Kamen Riders All Together!! TV special returns and also played a new double role as Ambassador Darkness, and Itsuji Itao of Kamen Rider The First played as Ren Aoi, a main antagonist of the film. It has been reported that Ryo Ryusei would return as Daigo Kiryu. The events of the movie take place between episodes 23 and 24.

Great Soccer Battle! Golden Fruits Cup!

 was released in Japanese theaters on July 19, 2014, double-billed with the film for Ressha Sentai ToQger. It was a collaboration with the Japanese soccer league J. League and featured cameo appearances by professional soccer players. The film's antagonist Kogane, Kamen Rider Mars, was portrayed by kabuki actor Kataoka Ainosuke VI. The events of the movie take place between episodes 37 and 38.

Movie War Full Throttle

 was released in Japanese theaters on December 13, 2014. It featured a crossover with the then airing Kamen Rider series Kamen Rider Drive as well as the epilogue of Gaim's story, reuniting the main cast.

Heisei Generations Final

A Movie War film, titled  was announced to be released on December 9, 2017. Along the casts of Kamen Rider Build and Kamen Rider Ex-Aid, Shu Watanabe and Ryosuke Miura (Kamen Rider OOO), Sota Fukushi (Kamen Rider Fourze), Gaku Sano (Kamen Rider Gaim), and Shun Nishime (Kamen Rider Ghost) reprised their respective roles.

Video game
A PlayStation 3 and Wii U sequel to Kamen Rider: Battride War titled  was released on June 26, 2014. It featured characters from Gaim as well as characters and scenarios based on the recent Kamen Rider series and films. A limited edition version of the game featuring music from the TV series and films was also released.

Hyper Battle DVD
As with every year, Televi-kun sells a limited edition  that tells a unique and non-canon story of the members of the cast. For Gaim, the DVD is titled . During the events of the DVD, Kota and Kaito learn their Lockseeds rusted as they and Mai are visited by the mysterious girl who cryptically tells them the best way to restore the Lockseeds is to make them "fresh." From cleaning the Team Gaim garage to Kaito making a fruit tart and then Mai setting up a fashion show, future Mai explains the final step is a fresh smile. Though Kota succeeds with his Lockseed transformed into a Fresh Orange Lockseed, Kaito is disillusioned and decides to go to Hellheim Forest. Found by Kamen Riders Zangetsu and Ryugen, who respectively equip the Mango and Pine Lockseeds, Kaito becomes Kamen Rider Baron Kiwi Arms to call out Kota as he transforms into the shiny Kamen Rider Gaim Fresh Orange Arms.

Gaim Gaiden

 is a set of two V-Cinema releases that focus on side stories of Takatora Kureshima as Kamen Rider Zangetsu and Kaito Kumon as Kamen Rider Baron. Both releases are named after their primary character. The films feature two new Kamen Riders, Kamen Rider Idun and Kamen Rider Tyrant. The V-Cinemas were released on April 22, 2015. The events of the movie take place between episodes 20 and 21.

A second Gaim Gaiden focusing on side stories of Ryoma Sengoku as Kamen Rider Duke and Zack as Kamen Rider Knuckle was released on November 11, 2015. The films feature two new Kamen Riders, Kamen Rider Saver and Kamen Rider Black Baron.

A third Gaim Gaiden titled  focusing on a side story of Hideyasu Jonouchi as Kamen Rider Gridon and Oren Pierre Alfonso as Kamen Rider Bravo was released on Toei Tokusatsu Fan Club on October 25, 2020. The web series features a new Kamen Rider, Kamen Rider Sylphy.

Novels
, written by Gun Snark and Jin Haganeya and supervised by Gen Urobuchi, is part of a series of spin-off novel adaptions of the Heisei Era Kamen Riders. The events of the novel took place after Kamen Rider Knuckle of Gaim Gaiden: Kamen Rider Duke/Kamen Rider Knuckle. The novel was released on March 24, 2016.
, written by Nobuhiro Mouri, is a novelization of the 2019 stage play . The novel was released on June 1, 2020. It takes place before Kamen Rider Gridon vs. Kamen Rider Bravo.

Video game
A PlayStation 3 and Wii U sequel to Kamen Rider: Battride War titled  was released on June 26, 2014. It featured characters from Gaim as well as characters and scenarios based on the then-recent Kamen Rider series and films. A limited edition version of the game featuring music from the TV series and films was also released.

Production and development

Trademarks on Kamen Rider Gaim were requested in May 20, 2013, and the show was officially announced on July 25, 2013. The series producer, Naomi Takebe, wanted Gaim to return to the style of early Heisei era series, in which multiple Riders are featured. Drawing inspiration from the Sengoku period, Bandai presented the idea of using fruits as a core theme to Takebe, which led to the creation of the Arms Change. Takebe approached Gen Urobuchi, known for Puella Magi Madoka Magica and Fate/Zero, to serve as the series main writer, and Ryuta Tasaki, who had previously worked on Kamen Rider Agito and Kamen Rider Ryuki, to direct. In an interview, Urobuchi states that Takebe requested that the series not follow the two-episode structure of recent series, as well as saying that he hopes to create the same kind of excitement he felt from Kamen Rider Black to a new generation. Urobuchi's company Nitroplus also assisted with designs.

The show's lead role went to 2011 Junon Super Boy Contest Grand Prix winner Gaku Sano, portraying Kota Kazuraba. Sano said that he grew up wishing he could be the character from Kamen Rider Kuuga, and now that he would portray Kamen Rider Gaim he hopes that he will inspire a new generation of boys. Rounding out the main cast are Yutaka Kobayashi as Kaito Kumon/Kamen Rider Baron, Mahiro Takasugi as Mitsuzane Kureshima/Kamen Rider Ryugen, Yuumi Shida from idol group Yumemiru Adolescence as the heroine Mai Takatsukasa, and Yuki Kubota as Takatora Kureshima/Kamen Rider Zangetsu.

Cast
: 
: 
: 
, : 
: 
: 
: 
: 
: 
: 
: 
: 
: 
: 
: 
: 
: 
: 
: 
: 
: 
: 
Sengoku Driver Equipment Voice: 
Genesis Driver Equipment Voice: 
Narration:

Guest cast

: 
: 
: 
: 
: 

:

Theme songs
Opening theme
"Just Live More"
Lyrics: Shoko Fujibayashi
Composition & Arrangement: Shuhei Naruse
Artist: 

Insert themes
"E-X-A (Exciting×Attitude)"
Lyrics: Shoko Fujibayashi
Composition & Arrangement: tatsuo (of everset)
Artist: Kamen Rider Girls
Episodes: 3, 5, 11
 "E-X-A (Exciting×Attitude)" is the theme for Kamen Rider Gaim.
"Never surrender"
Lyrics: Shoko Fujibayashi
Composition & Arrangement: Junichi "IGAO" Igarashi
Artist: Team Baron (Kaito Kumon, Zack, & Peco) (Yutaka Kobayashi, Gaku Matsuda, & Saku Momose)
Episodes: 8, 26, 37
 "Never surrender" is the theme for Kamen Rider Baron.

Lyrics: Shoko Fujibayashi 
Composition: Naoki Maeda
Arrangement: Shuhei Naruse
Artist: Kamen Rider Girls
Episodes: 17, 21, 29
 "Toki no Hana" is the theme for Kamen Rider Gaim Jimber Lemon Arms.
"Raise Up Your Flag"
Lyrics: Shoko Fujibayashi
Composition & Arrangement: tatsuo (of everset)
Artist: Kota Kazuraba (Gaku Sano)
Episodes: "Spring Break Combined Special", 24, 28, 30, 37
 "Raise Up Your Flag" is the theme for Kamen Rider Gaim Kachidoki Arms.

Lyrics: Shoko Fujibayashi
Composition & Arrangement: Shuhei Naruse
Artist: Kota Kazuraba & Kaito Kumon (Gaku Sano & Yutaka Kobayashi)
Episodes: 36, 37, 39, 41, 45
 "Ranbu Escalation" is the theme for Kamen Rider Gaim Kiwami Arms and Baron Lemon Energy Arms.

References

External links

 at Toei Company

 
Gaim
2013 Japanese television series debuts
2014 Japanese television series endings
TV Asahi original programming
Nitroplus
Biopunk television series
Dark fantasy television series
Japanese fantasy television series
Sengoku period in fiction
Martial arts television series